Rubicon Harvest  is the debut novel from American author C. W. Kesting. Released in October 2008 through Wings ePress, Rubicon Harvest is available in both electronic format and trade paperback.

Rubicon Harvest is a science fiction adventure that offers a near-futuristic world in which the issues surrounding the utilization of embryonic stem cells have been long resolved and diseases like diabetes and Parkinson's have been completely eradicated through the Advanced Stem Cell Initiative. Technological breakthroughs in optical computer processing, human genomics, and the globalization of governments through corporate economics have thrust society into quantum leaps of forced adaptation.

See also
Rubicon

References

External links
Google books: 
C. W. Kesting on goodreads website

2008 American novels
2008 science fiction novels
American science fiction novels
2008 debut novels